Yang Yumin (Chinese:杨玉敏; born 1 January 1955) is a former Chinese footballer who played for China PR in the 1980 Asian Cup. He spent all of his player career in Liaoning football team.

Playing career
Yang Yumin start his footballer career at the age of 17. He spent all of his player career in Liaoning football team. In 1977, he was called up to China national football team, and represented for China in the 1980 Asian Cup and qualifying for the 1982 FIFA World Cup. Yang retired from football in 1982.

Management career
Yang Yumin had ever worked as the coach of Liaoning football team third Place. From 1998 to 1999, Yang worked as the coach of Jiangsu football team. In 2009, he worked as caretaker coach of Shenyang Dongjin F.C.

Personal life
Yang Yumin's daughter Yang Banban is a basketball player.

References

External links
Team China Stats

1955 births
Living people
Chinese footballers
Chinese football managers
1980 AFC Asian Cup players
China international footballers
Footballers from Dalian
Liaoning F.C. players
Asian Games bronze medalists for China
Asian Games medalists in football
Association football forwards
Footballers at the 1978 Asian Games
Medalists at the 1978 Asian Games
Liaoning F.C. managers
Jiangsu F.C. managers